The 2016–17 Scottish League Cup group stage was played from 15 July to 31 July 2016. A total of 40 teams competed in the group stage. The winners of each of the 8 groups, as well as the 4 best runners-up progressed to the second round (last 16) of the 2016–17 Scottish League Cup.

Format
The group stage is made up of 9 teams from the 2015–16 Scottish Premiership, 9 from the 2015–16 Scottish Championship, 10 from each of the 2015–16 Scottish League One and 2015–16 Scottish League Two, as well as the winners of the 2015–16 Highland Football League and 2015–16 Lowland Football League, and will see these 40 teams divided into two sections: 4 groups of 20 teams from the North section and 4 groups of 20 teams from the South sections. Each section comprises four top seeded teams, four second seeded teams and 12 unseeded teams, with each group being made up of 1 top seed, 1 second seed and 3 unseeded sides. The draw for the group stages took place on 27 May 2016 at 7:30pm BST at the BT Sport Studio in London and was shown live on BT Sport Europe.

Teams
Teams in Bold qualified for the second round

Seeding

North

South

North
All times are BST (UTC+1).

Group A

Matches

Group B

Matches

Group C

Matches

Group D

Matches

South
All times are BST (UTC+1).

Group E

Matches

Group F

Matches

Group G

Matches

Group H

Matches

Best runners-up

Qualified teams

Top goalscorers

References

External links
Scottish Professional Football League – League Cup official website

Scottish League Cup group stages
2016–17 in Scottish football cups